The 2023 FIVB Volleyball Men's U21 World Championship was the 22nd edition of the FIVB Volleyball Men's U21 World Championship, contested by the men's national teams under the age of 21 of the members of the FIVB, the sport's global governing body. The tournament will be held from 7 to 16 July 2023.

Athletes must born on or after 1 January 2003.

Qualification
A total of 16 teams qualified for the final tournament.

See also
2023 FIVB Volleyball Women's U21 World Championship

References

External links
Basic Conditions for organising Junior & Youth World Championships

FIVB Volleyball Men's U21 World Championship
2023 in volleyball
2023 in men's volleyball
World Championship U21